The 1868 Steam Locomotive Class C1s used in the Grand Duchy of Finland, an autonomous part of the Russian Empire until 1917, were typical of the Victorian principles of locomotive design and the British 0-6-0 of the period, with inside cylinders and Stephenson link motion. There is a similarity with the NER Class C1,  Caledonian Railway 294 and 711 Classes,  Caledonian Railway 812 and 652 Classes, LB&SCR C class, and SER O class. The wood-burning smoke stacks and wooden cab sides were installed for Finnish conditions. Neilson and Company also supplied a number of similar 5-foot-gauge 0-6-0s to other railways in the Russian Empire, but few photographs and drawings remain. No 1427 at the Finnish Railway Museum is the only preserved example, and is the only surviving example of the varied 0-6-0 types that were once common across the Russian Empire in the 19th Century. It therefore provides one of the few clues as to the design of these Russian 0-6-0 locomotives that we now have. In fact, No.30 ended up remaining in Finland Station, St. Petersburg, Russia in 1918 during the civil wars in Finland and Russia.

No 1427 is the second-oldest locomotive in Finland, after the 1868 Beyer Peacocks 0-4-2T. It is builder’s numbers 1427, a Finnish class C1 and carried running number 21. It was the first freight locomotive for Finnish Railways, then called SVR. In particular it was the first of a batch of 10 supplied (builder’s numbers 1427–1436 and running numbers 21–30) to the Riihimäki–Saint Petersburg railway in 1869. They later also ran to Helsinki and Turku. No 1427 was withdrawn in 1926, and the last of the class was withdrawn in 1929.

See also

 Finnish Railway Museum
 VR Group
 List of Finnish locomotives
 Jokioinen Museum Railway
 History of rail transport in Finland

External links
Finnish Railway Museum (archived 2012)
Steam Locomotives in Finland Including the Finnish Railway Museum

Gallery

References

VR locomotives
C1
5 ft gauge locomotives
0-6-0 locomotives
Neilson locomotives